The Master's catfish, also called the Godfrey's catfish, (Hexanematichthys mastersi) is a species of catfish in the family Ariidae. It was described by James Douglas Ogilby in 1898, originally under the genus Arius. It dwells on the floors of inshore marine waters in Australia and Papua New Guinea.

References

Ariidae
Fish described in 1898